Woodstock Express is a steel roller coaster at Michigan's Adventure near Muskegon, Michigan. It was manufactured by Chance Rides and is operated by Cedar Fair. It is a family coaster aimed at smaller children. The minimum height is 36 inches, with a parent.

The roller coaster was originally named Big Dipper and was a part of a large upgrade to the entrance of the park. During this same year, new entrance turnstiles were installed, a new gate was constructed, Mad Mouse was built, and new buildings were constructed.

In 2020, the Big Dipper was to be relocated to the Camp Snoopy section of the park, and was to be renamed the Woodstock Express. It reopened in 2021.

References

External links

Official page

Roller coasters in Michigan
Roller coasters introduced in 1999
Michigan's Adventure
Roller coasters operated by Cedar Fair